Aaron Spike Davis is an American rugby union player who last played for the Ohio Aviators in PRO Rugby. His position is at Wing. He represented the United States in the 2017 Americas Rugby Championship. He signed with the Ohio Aviators for the inaugural PRO Rugby season in 2016 but was unable to sign for a Major League Rugby side due to being banned for using prohibited performance enhancing substances by World Rugby.

Career
Before taking up rugby on a full-time professional basis, Davis played American football. He played college football for the SMU Mustangs from 2009 to 2012. He started as a walk-on football player at SMU but earned a scholarship. At SMU, he bulked up from 215 to 290 pounds, and played defensive line and special teams. He hoped to play in the NFL after college, and was involved in mini camps for the Green Bay Packers and Washington Redskins in the NFL, but never signed with a team.

In the inaugural 2016 PRO Rugby season, Davis led the league in tries with 14, five more than the next closest player's tally.

Drugs Ban
In August 2017 it was announced that Spike Davis had failed a urine drug screen in January 2017 and following a failed appeal had been issued a ban by World Rugby preventing him from playing rugby at any level for 4 years. Spike became eligible to resume playing rugby on 17 March 2021.

References
http://en.espn.co.uk/scrum/rugby/player/294666.html

Rugby union wings
American rugby union players
Ohio Aviators players
Living people
1990 births
United States international rugby union players